Plouzévédé is a commune in the Finistère department of Brittany in north-western France.

Population
Inhabitants of Plouzévédé are called in French Plouzévédéens.

References

External links

Mayors of Finistère Association 

Communes of Finistère